Raimundas Labuckas (born February 9, 1984) is a Lithuanian sprint canoeist who has competed since 2005. He won four medals in the C-2 200 m event at the ICF Canoe Sprint World Championships with two golds (2009, 2010) and two bronzes (2006, 2007).

Labuckas also competed in the C-2 500 m event at the 2008 Summer Olympics in Beijing, but was eliminated in the semifinals.

In 2013 Labuckas officially ended his career and stated that he was willing to use all his experience by being a coach.

References

Canoe09.ca profile

Sports-reference.com profile

1984 births
Canoeists at the 2008 Summer Olympics
Lithuanian male canoeists
Living people
Olympic canoeists of Lithuania
Sportspeople from Vilnius
ICF Canoe Sprint World Championships medalists in Canadian
21st-century Lithuanian people